The Shaikh of the Indian state of  Rajasthan are part of the wider Shaikh community of South Asia. They form the largest single Muslim community of the state. Many members of Rajasthani Shaikh community have also migrated to Pakistan after independence and have settled in Karachi, Sindh.

Origin and Present Circumstances

The word Shaikh, can means an elder of a tribe, a lord,  a revered old man, or Islamic scholar. In Rajasthan, the Shaikh community is of heterogenous origins, and as elsewhere in South Asia may be on occasion be descendants of the converts of Vaishya community to Islam. They speak Mewari among themselves, and Urdu with outsiders. The Shaikh are found mainly in the districts of Ajmer, Udaipur and Jodhpur. Their main sub-divisions are the Silawat and Rangrez.

The community is endogamous, and they practice both parallel cousin and cross-cousin marriages. Their main occupation is trade, and many are now engaged in the sale of textiles and gold. Some of the Shaikh own land, and are cultivators. In addition, some Shaikh have an expertise in cloth printing and wall painting. They are Sunni Muslims and a fairly orthodox.

See also

 Shaikhs in South Asia

References

Social groups of Rajasthan
Shaikh clans
Muslim communities of India
Social groups of Pakistan
Muslim communities of Rajasthan